Dumbarton Academy is a mixed secondary school in Dumbarton, West Dunbartonshire, Scotland.

Location
The school is situated near the railway off the B830 in the east of Dumbarton. St James Retail Park is on the opposite side of the North Clyde Line.

History
Dumbarton Academy, which was originally based in the tower of Dumbarton Parish Church, dates back to the 15th century. It moved to a rented room in a building in the High Street known as "Walker's Close" in 1761 and to a new purpose-built building on the west side of Church Street, close to the corner with the High Street, in 1789. After that building was also found to be inadequate, a new combined burgh hall and academy was erected in Church Street in 1866 designed by William Leiper. The academy then moved to a site formerly occupied by Braehead House in Townend Road in August 1914, before being converted into a comprehensive school and relocating to Crosslet Road in Hartfield in 1972.

Today
Today the school serves the catchment area of Dumbarton and currently has an enrollment of over 600 pupils. Alison Boyles is the head teacher.

The school received a positive report from the 2009 HMIE inspection.

The school currently operates a policy of inclusion with recent initiatives taken to increase the inclusion rate for less able pupils and decrease the rate of bullying in the school.

Notable teachers

 Raymond Robertson, Conservative MP 1992-97 for Aberdeen South

Notable alumni

 

 Professor John Campbell Brown, Regius Professor of Astronomy since 1996 at the University of Glasgow, Professor of Astrophysics 1984-96, and Astronomer Royal for Scotland since 1995

 Ian Campbell, Labour MP 1983-87 for Dumbarton, and 1970-83 for Dunbartonshire West

 A. J. Cronin, novelist
 Sir Archibald Denny, ship builder
 John McAusland Denny, Conservative MP 1895-1906 for Kilmarnock Burghs

 Douglas Gordon, Scottish artist and Turner Prize winner, 1978-1983
 Patrick Harvie, Co-Convenor of the Scottish Green Party

 John Hutcheson, New Zealand politician

 Graeme Ramage, professional footballer
 Professor John Rorke CBE, Professor of Mechanical Engineering 1980-88 at Heriot-Watt University

 David Steel, Baron Steel of Aikwood
 Sir Jackie Stewart, racing driver who won three Formula One championships
 William Strang, painter

References

External links
 

Dumbarton
Secondary schools in West Dunbartonshire